Balla Gabir Kortokaila (born 12 September 1985, in Umm Dawm) is a Sudanese footballer, who currently plays for Sudanese side El-Merreikh.

Career
He plays as a left back or a winger. He was brought from Hay al-Arab in December 2007 to El-Merreikh. He scored his first goal for the club was against Amal Atbara when his side won 3:0 in Omdurman. He is known for his speed and rough tackling and sliding tackling.

International career
He is a member of the Sudan national football team.

References

1985 births
Sudanese footballers
Living people
2011 African Nations Championship players
2012 Africa Cup of Nations players
Al-Merrikh SC players
People from North Kurdufan
Association football fullbacks
Association football wingers
Sudan international footballers
Sudan A' international footballers